José Agripino Maia (born May 23, 1945) is a Brazilian politician. He served as governor of Rio Grande do Norte, from 1983 to 1986. He is the national president of Democrats (DEM), and senator. He was born in Mossoró, the son of Tarcísio Maia.

Political career 

In 1965, Maia joins ARENA, following the footsteps of his father.

In 1974, Maia supports his father, Tarcísio Maia, for governor of Rio Grande do Norte.

In 1978, Maia supports Lavoisier Maia, for governor.

In 1979, Maia was appointed by governor Lavoisier Maia.

In 1982, Maia faces Alves and ends up winning the election, with support of governor Lavoisier Maia.

In 1984, Maia supports the name of Andrezza, who was defeated by Maluf, supported by Lavoisier Maia. Thus, Maia decides to create the Front Liberal, to support Neves.

In 1985, Maia supports Wilma Maia, for mayor, who was defeated by Filho.

In 1986, Maia supports João Faustino, who also was defeated by Geraldo Melo.

In 1989, Maia supports Collor, of the PRN, who was elected president of Brazil.

In 1990, Maia defeated Lavoisier Maia.

In 1994, Maia closes alliance PSDB–PFL, after the resignation of presidential candidacy of Lavoisier Maia, who will complete in the government, with support of Cardoso.

In 1996, Maia supports Wilma de Faria, for mayor.

In 1998, Maia applied for the governor, with support of Cardoso

In 2001, Maia breaks FHC.

In 2002, Maia supports Ciro Gomes, after Lula.

In 2008, Maia supports Micarla, for mayor, against Fátima Bezerra. Micarla went on to win the election.

In 2010, Maia was re-elected senator.

In 2014, Maia becomes general coordinator of presidential campaign of Neves.

Maia was one of the fiercest opponents of the Dilma government.

See also
 List of mayors of Natal, Rio Grande do Norte

References 

1945 births
Democrats (Brazil) politicians
Democratic Social Party politicians
Governors of Rio Grande do Norte
Members of the Federal Senate (Brazil)
Living people
Mayors of Natal, Rio Grande do Norte
People from Mossoró